Reid River is a locality split between the Charters Towers Region and the City of Townsville in Queensland, Australia. In the  Reid River had a population of 115 people.

History 
The locality takes its name from the river which was named about 1864 after explorer Mark Watt Reid.

Haughton Valley Provisional School opened circa 1885 and closed in 1891. Reid River Provisional School opened in 1892; it is unclear if this is a different school or a renaming of the Haughton Valley school. On 1 January 1909 it became Reid River State School. It closed on 31 December 1966.

In the  Reid River had a population of 115 people.

Geography
The Haughton River forms the south-eastern boundary. The Reid River flows through from west to south-east where it joins the Haughton.

Road infrastructure
The Flinders Highway runs through from north to south.

References 

Charters Towers Region
City of Townsville
Localities in Queensland